General Viljoen may refer to:

Barend Viljoen (1908–1995), South African Air Force major general
Ben Viljoen (1869–1917), South African Republic general
Constand Viljoen (1933–2020), South African Army general